Southington is a station stop on the RTA Blue Line in Shaker Heights, Ohio, located at the intersection of Southington Road and Van Aken Boulevard.

History
The station opened on April 11, 1920 with the initiation of rail service by the Cleveland Interurban Railroad on what is now Van Aken Boulevard from Lynnfield Road to Shaker Square and then to East 34th Street and via surface streets to downtown.

In 1980 and 1981, the Green and Blue Lines were completely renovated with new track, ballast, poles and wiring, and new stations were built along the line. The renovated line along Van Aken Boulevard opened on October 30, 1981.

Station layout

The station consists of two side platforms, the westbound platform southeast of the intersection, and the eastbound platform northwest of the intersection, with a small shelter on each platform. Diagonal parking is provided off Van Aken Boulevard adjacent to each platform.

References

External links

Blue Line (RTA Rapid Transit)
Railway stations in the United States opened in 1920
1920 establishments in Ohio